The Campeonato Brasileiro Série C 1992, known as the Divisão Classificatória, was a football series played from 22 March to 13 June 1992. It was the third level of the Brazilian National League.

Initially scheduled with 25 clubs, the Brazilian Football Confederation announced the participation of 42 teams, but stated that they would not subside the costs of traveling and lodging. After this, several clubs withdrawn from the competition, which ended up with only 31 teams.

At the end of the tournament, none of the clubs were promoted as the Brazilian Football Confederation did not establish a Série C nor a Série B for the 1993 campaign.

First phase

Group 1

Group 2

Group 3

Group 4

Group 5

Group 6

Group 7

Second phase

Group A

Group B

Semifinal
Matches played on 10 and 17 May.

|}
Fluminense de Feira qualified due to best record.

Final
Matches played on 24 and 27 May.

|}

Final

Tuna Luso declared as the Campeonato Brasileiro Série C champions after better record during the tournament (3–3 aggregate score).

References

Campeonato Brasileiro Série C seasons
1992 in Brazilian football leagues